is a Japanese manga artist, best known for being the creator of The Law of Ueki and its sequel, The Law of Ueki Plus. Fukuchi's most recent manga, Golden Spiral, debuted in 2022 in Weekly Shōnen Sunday.

The Law of Ueki was adapted into a 51–episode anime series.

Manga artists Ato Sakurai (author of Artist Acro) and Ryō Azuchi (author of Softenni) were once his assistants.

Early life
Tsubasa Fukuchi was born in Tochigi Prefecture, north of Tokyo. He won his first prize in 1998, at Manga College contest with his work Kōderi at the age of 18. Fukuchi began his professional career in 2001 with The Law of Ueki.

Works
 (2001–2005, serialized in Weekly Shōnen Sunday, Shogakukan)
 (2005–2007, serialized in Weekly Shōnen Sunday, Shogakukan)
 (2009–2011, serialized in Shōnen Sunday Super, Shogakukan)
Anagle Mole (2011–2014, serialized in Weekly Shōnen Sunday, Shogakukan)
 (2014–2018, serialized in Weekly Shōnen Sunday, Shogakukan)
 (2019–2021, serialized in Weekly Shōnen Sunday, Shogakukan)
Golden Spiral (2022–present, serialized in Weekly Shōnen Sunday, Shogakukan)

References

External links

1980 births
Living people
Manga artists from Tochigi Prefecture